Béla Lakatos (born 26 September 1984) is a former Hungarian football player who formerly played for Mezőkövesd-Zsóry SE.

External links
 Profile
 MLSZ

1984 births
Living people
People from Salgótarján
Hungarian footballers
Association football midfielders
Kaposvölgye VSC footballers
Diósgyőri VTK players
Mezőkövesdi SE footballers
Nemzeti Bajnokság I players
Sportspeople from Nógrád County